Project FF  or Fat Fucker was a Central Intelligence Agency (CIA) project aimed at pressuring King Farouk of Egypt to make political reforms that would lessen the likelihood of violent political change in the country contrary to American interests. The government of the United States was concerned that the ever-increasing political instability in Egypt, much of it linked to the perceived corruption and incompetence of both the royal court and the traditional political establishment, would inevitably result in the toppling of the Egyptian government if not remedied. In particular, they feared the prospect of a partial or full communist takeover. The project was masterminded by CIA Director Allen Dulles, Secretary of State Dean Acheson, CIA operative Kermit "Kim" Roosevelt Jr., and CIA Station Chief in Cairo Miles Copeland, Jr.

Historian Matthew F. Holland wrote: "Kim's idea was to orchestrate 'peaceful revolution' in Egypt to replace the corrupt political system in Egypt with a progressive dictatorship under the king that would be more amenable to American control. Copeland had unofficially named the operation 'Project FF', the 'FF' unflatteringly standing for 'fat Fucker'."

However, due to the unwillingness of Farouk to change, the project moved to support his overthrow. Roosevelt secretly met with the Free Officers Movement, a group of nationalist revolutionaries in the army of Egypt and Sudan that was opposed to the monarchy, and the United Kingdom's continuing military presence in the country. The Free Officers, led by Mohamed Naguib and Gamal Abdel Nasser, had already been planning to overthrow Farouk, and launched their revolution with a coup d'etat against the King on 23 July 1952. Miles Copeland states that the US provided support for the revolutionary government to be "coup proof", helping in establishing the new General Intelligence Agency (Al-Mukhabarat el Aam), modelled after the American Central Intelligence Agency, as well as German advisors who had served in German military intelligence, including the Abwehr, to create the new security apparatus.

Operation Fat Fucker was used as a blueprint for Operation Ajax, the CIA role in the US and UK backed coup in Iran against the democratically elected Prime minister Mohammad Mosaddegh the following year.

See also
1949 Syrian coup d'état
1953 Iranian coup d'état
United States involvement in regime change

References

Central Intelligence Agency operations
CIA activities in Africa
20th century in Egypt
Egypt–United States relations
1950s coups d'état and coup attempts